Oh Sang-uk (born 30 September 1996) is a South Korean right-handed sabre fencer.

Oh is a four-time team Asian champion, 2019 individual Asian champion, three-time team world champion, and 2019 individual world champion.

Competing at his first Summer Olympic Games, Oh was a member of the South Korean team that won gold in team men's sabre at the 2020 Tokyo Olympic Games.

Early life 
Oh followed his older brother into fencing and joined his middle school's fencing team. A native of Daejeon, he attended Songchon High School, known as a high school fencing powerhouse in the region, and began representing the national team in the youth categories. During his senior year, he won gold in the individual sabre event at the national high school championships and his high school team won in the team event.

Career 
Oh had been a stand-out in the junior and cadet categories and quickly drew attention for defeating then-ranked world number 1 and 2012 Olympic team gold medalist Gu Bon-gil in the Round of 16 of the 2015 National Championships. He was earmarked as a successor to Kim Jung-hwan, whom he idolized in high school and who was speculated to be retiring after the 2016 Olympics, due to their similar aggressive style of play and agility. While he did not make it to the final, he was ranked high enough to qualify for the senior national team, a rarity for a teenager as fencers were generally selected for the national team while in college. At that time, the men's sabre team went through a generational change with the retirements of 2012 Olympic team gold medalists Oh Eun-seok and Won Woo-young. The nineteen-year-old was added into the team with Kim Jun-ho, joining veterans Kim Jung-hwan and Gu Bon-gil for the 2016 Asian Championships. He won his first ever gold medal in a major international tournament when they won the team gold.

Due the now-abolished rotation system, there was no men's team sabre event at the 2016 Summer Olympics. Oh did not rank high enough to qualify for the individual event. He won back-to-back gold medals with the same team at the World Championships and Asian Championships, in 2017 and 2018. In the 2018 Asian Games, he reached the final of the individual event and was defeated by Gu, taking silver. However, his gold medal in the team event meant that he was exempted from mandatory military service. Kim Jung-hwan retired from the national team after the Asian Games and was replaced by Ha Han-sol.

Oh won four gold medals in 2019, winning in both the team and individual events at the World Championships and Asian Championships. Kim Jung-hwan came out of retirement and the gold medal-winning team from the 2017 and 2018 Worlds was reunited again and qualified for the 2020 Summer Olympics, which was postponed for a year. He was nearly unable to participate as he contracted COVID-19 several months prior to the Olympics and then sustained an ankle injury during pre-competition training.

Oh went into the Olympics ranked world number 1, thus earning a spot in the individual event. However, he lost to Sandro Bazadze in the quarter-finals. He won his first Olympic medal when they won gold in the team event. In the team semi-finals, he scored the last point in a narrow 45–42 win over Germany, sending the South Koreans to the final for a second consecutive time. During the final against Italy, with the score at 40–21 to South Korea, Oh nearly conceded their lead but managed to score the final five points to win 45–26, the exact same score in the final nine years prior.

Medal Record

Olympic Games

World Championship

Asian Championship

Grand Prix

World Cup

Personal life 
Oh is in a relationship with foil fencer Hong Hyo-jin, who is 2 years older than him.

Oh attended Daejeon University, known for its fencing team, on a scholarship and graduated in 2019.

Filmography

Television shows

References

External links

1996 births
Living people
Sportspeople from Daejeon
South Korean male sabre fencers
Fencers at the 2018 Asian Games
Asian Games gold medalists for South Korea
Asian Games medalists in fencing
Medalists at the 2018 Asian Games
Universiade medalists in fencing
Universiade gold medalists for South Korea
Medalists at the 2017 Summer Universiade
Medalists at the 2019 Summer Universiade
Fencers at the 2020 Summer Olympics
Medalists at the 2020 Summer Olympics
Olympic gold medalists for South Korea
Olympic medalists in fencing
Olympic fencers of South Korea
World Fencing Championships medalists
21st-century South Korean people